Chenopodium pratericola is a species of flowering plant in the goosefoot family known by the common name desert goosefoot. It is native to much of western and central North America, where it grows in many types of open habitat, such as sagebrush, often on alkaline soils.

It is an annual herb growing up to 65 to 80 centimeters tall, sometimes branching. It is powdery in texture, especially on the leaves and flowers. The leaves are oval to lance-shaped and some are lobed. The inflorescences are located in leaf axils and in panicles at the end of the stem. Each is a small, dense cluster of tiny flowers.

External links
Jepson Manual Treatment
USDA Plants Profile
Flora of North America

pratericola
Flora of the Western United States
Flora of the United States
Flora of the Sierra Nevada (United States)
Flora of the Rocky Mountains
Flora of California
Flora of the Great Basin
Flora of the California desert regions
Flora of New Jersey
Flora of Alabama
Flora without expected TNC conservation status